Peter Houck Riehlman (December 10, 1933 – June 6, 2013) was an American football coach. He served as the head football coach at California State University, Chico from 1968 to 1973 and at Weber State University from 1977 to 1980, compiling a career college football coaching record of 56–48. Riehlman played college football for head coach Jack Curtice at the University of Utah as a tackle in 1954 and 1955, before graduating in 1956. He served as the freshman line coach at his alma mater in the fall of 1956. Riehlman was the head football coach at San Lorenzo High School in San Lorenzo, California from 1959 to 1962, before moving to University of California, Santa Barbara to work as an assistant for Curtice.

Head coaching record

College

References

External links
 

1933 births
2013 deaths
American football tackles
Chico State Wildcats football coaches
The Hawaiians coaches
UC Santa Barbara Gauchos football coaches
Utah Utes football coaches
Utah Utes football players
Weber State Wildcats football coaches
High school football coaches in California
High school football coaches in Nevada